Oakland is a historic plantation house located at Airlie, Halifax County, North Carolina. It was built in 1823, and is a two-story, three bay by three bay, Federal-style frame dwelling.  It has a temple-form and pedimented gable front facade.

It was listed on the National Register of Historic Places in 1973.

References

Plantation houses in North Carolina
Houses on the National Register of Historic Places in North Carolina
Federal architecture in North Carolina
Houses completed in 1823
Houses in Halifax County, North Carolina
National Register of Historic Places in Halifax County, North Carolina